This is a list of the dances and marches written by the Austrian composer Karl Michael Ziehrer (1843–1922). They are arranged in opus number order.

References

External links
 Complete list of Ziehrer's compositions from the Johann Strauss Society of Great Britain

Ziehrer, Karl Michael, List of dances and marches by